Daizang is a Zou village within Churachandpur district of Manipur, India. This place is best known for hosting the first JCA Conference on 20 February 1954. This historic meet was a watershed in the social history of the Zou people in India. It marked the mass conversion of the Zou community from their pagan Sakhua religion to the Christian faith.

Daizang is also the birthplace of the Zomi National Congress, formed in 1972. It heralded a new political awakening and consciousness among the Zomi.

Villages in Churachandpur district